Alexandros Lykourgos (1827–1875) was a Greek theologian, Greek Orthodox cleric and university professor.

Born in Samos Island in 1827, after extended studies in Germany (Leipzig, Heidelberg, Halle and Berlin) and a pilgrimage to Palestine he returned to Greece in 1858. He was appointed professor of theology at the University of Athens, and elected Greek Orthodox bishop of Syros and Tenos, islands of the Cyclades with significant Roman Catholic populations with whom according to French consular reports he was in conflictual relations circa 1864. He is particularly known for his visit to England to consecrate the Greek Orthodox church of St. Nicholas in Liverpool. His visit (1869-70) however took in stays with William Ewart Gladstone at Hawarden, with another Hellenist, Bishop Christopher Wordsworth of Lincoln, with the Bishop of London, honorary degrees from Oxford and Cambridge and a visit to Queen Victoria at Windsor Castle.

Lycurgos was involved in talks with Old Catholics in Bonn, where he stoutly defended the Orthodox position on the Procession of the Holy Spirit and influenced the decision of Old Catholics to abandon the Filioque clause .

He died on 17 October 1875 (O.S.).

References

 Felicia Mary Frances Skene, the Life of Alexander Lycurgos, Archbishop of the Cyclades, Rivington's, 1877 [Project Canterbury]
 

1827 births
1875 deaths
Bishops of the Church of Greece
People from Samos
19th-century Greek people
Academic staff of the National and Kapodistrian University of Athens